De Flat is a 1994 Dutch mystery film directed by Ben Verbong.

Plot summary
Roos Hartman is a young doctor who lives with her son in a large apartment complex. When a fellow tenant is brutally murdered, the police and Hartman's friends suspect her mysterious neighbour, Eric Coenen. As she becomes romantically involved with Coenen, she doubts he would commit such a crime, but soon she begins to investigate the case further and discovers some startling facts relating to his involvement.

Cast
 Renée Soutendijk as Roos Hartman
 Victor Löw as Eric Coenen
 Hans Hoes as Jacques Posthuma
 Jaimy Siebel as Davy
 Mirjam de Rooij as Lidy van Oosterom
 Leslie de Gruyter as Hennie van Oosterom
 Guy Sonnen as Cees den Boer
 Huib Rooymans as Erwin Nijkamp
 Miguel Stigter as Marcel van der Kooy
 Jacques Commandeur as Charles Uffingh
 Maud Hempel as Nel van Lier
 Ann Hasekamp as Mrs. Veenstra
 Peter Smits as Officer
 Jaap Maarleveld as Carel Wijnsma

External links
 
 

1994 films
1990s mystery films
Dutch thriller films
1990s Dutch-language films
Films directed by Ben Verbong
Films shot in the Netherlands